Der Nister ("the Hidden One"; 1 November 1884 – 4 June 1950 in a Soviet Gulag) was the pseudonym of Pinchus Kahanovich, a Yiddish author, philosopher, translator, and critic.

Early years
Kahanovich was born in Berdychiv, Ukraine, the third in a family of four children with ties to the Korshev sect of Hasidic Judaism. His father was Menakhem Mendl Kahanovich, a smoked-fish merchant at Astrakhan on the Volga River; his mother's name was Leah. He received a traditional religious education, but was drawn through his reading to secular and Enlightenment ideas, as well as to Zionism. In 1904 he left Berdychiv hoping to evade the military draft, and this was probably the time when he started using the pseudonym. He moved to Zhytomyr, near Kiev, where he earned a modest living as a teacher of Hebrew at an orphanage for Jewish boys.

At that time he also wrote his first book, in Yiddish, Gedankn un motivn - lider in proze ("Ideas and Motifs - Prose Poems"), published in Vilna in 1907. He also made the acquaintance of the Yiddish writer I. L. Peretz, whom he greatly admired. Peretz recognised Der Nister's literary talents, and helped and encouraged him to publish his prose Hekher fun der Erd ("Higher than the Earth"), published in Warsaw in 1910.

In 1912, Kahanovich married Rokhel Zilberberg, a teacher. Their daughter, Hodel, was born in July 1913, shortly after the publication of his third book, Gezang un gebet ("Song and Prayer") in Kiev. At the outbreak of World War I, he found work in the timber industry, which gave him exemption from military service. He continued to write and produced in 1918/19 the first of his books for children, Mayselech in ferzn ("Erzählungen in Versen"; "Stories in Verse"). Also at this time he translated several of Andersen's fairy tales.

Life
In 1920, he lived for a few months in a Jewish orphanage at Malakhovka, Moscow Oblast, where he worked as a teacher for Jewish orphans, whose parents had been killed during the Tsarist pogroms from 1904 to 1906. Here he met other Jewish artists and intellectuals, among them David Hofstein, Leib Kvitko and Marc Chagall.

Probably in early 1921 Kahanovich left Malakowka and moved with his family to Kovno (now Kaunas), Lithuania. Here he had great difficulty earning a living, and decided to leave, as many other Russian intellectuals were doing, and moved to Berlin, Germany, where his son Joseph was born. From 1922 to 1924 he worked there as a freelancer for the Yiddish journal Milgroim ("Pomegranate") and also edited, along with David Bergelson, several Yiddish literary journals, though they didn't last long. In Berlin, he also published a two-volume collection of his short stories under the title Gedakht ("Imagined"). The book was his first modest literary success. When the Milgroim closed in 1924, he moved with his family to Hamburg, where he worked for two years for the Soviet Trade Mission.

In 1926, like many fellow exiles, he returned to the Soviet Union and settled in Kharkiv. In 1929, he published in Kiev Fun mayne giter ("From My Estates"). The work contained a complicated web of metaphors tied to Hasidic mysticism - especially on the Kabbalah and the symbolic stories of Nachman of Breslov - that can create a universe of images and parables, folk tales, children's poems and rhymes. His long sentences create a hypnotic rhythm. But they also reflect the increasing pressure that has been exerted at that time by the Soviet regime on Jewish intellectuals. However, the symbol-laden work, rich in Jewish themes, was declared reactionary by the Soviet regime and its literary critics. He was subjected to the increasingly stringent Soviet censorship. In 1929, he was criticized when the Russian Yiddish newspaper Di Royte Velt ("The Red World") reprinted his tale Unter a Ployt ("Bottom Fence"). The then president of the Russian Yiddish Writers Federation, Moyshe Litvakov, initiated a smear campaign at the end of which Der Nister had to renounce the literary symbolism.

He tried now to write his literary work within the constraints of prevailing socialist realism and began to write stories. These collected essays appeared in 1934 under the title Hoyptshtet ("Capital cities"). He stopped publishing his original works and earned a living as a journalist. In the early 1930s he worked almost exclusively as a journalist and translator, translating works by Tolstoy, Victor Hugo and Jack London. His own literary work was limited to four small collections of short stories for children.

Just before World War II, the Soviet government briefly adopted less censorious policies over writings considered to be promoting Zionism. Der Nister began working on his real masterpiece: Di Mishpokhe Mashber ("The Family Mashber"). The first volume of work appeared in 1939 in Moscow. The work was almost universally praised by critics, and he seemed to be rehabilitated. But the success did not last long. The limited edition of the first volume sold out quickly, but the Second World War and the German invasion of the Soviet Union in 1941, made publication of a second edition impossible. The second volume, dedicated to his daughter Hodel, who starved to death at the siege of Leningrad in early 1942, was not published until 1948 in New York. The manuscript of the third volume, the completion of which Der Nister, mentioned in a letter, has been lost.

During World War II, Der Nister was evacuated to Tashkent, where he wrote stories about the horrors of the persecution of Jews in German-occupied Poland, which had been described to him by friends firsthand. These collected stories were published in 1943 under the title Korbones ("Victims") in Moscow, where he had retired with his second wife Lena Singalowska, a former actress of the Yiddish theater in Kiev. In April 1942, Stalin ordered the formation of the Jewish Anti-Fascist Committee designed to influence international public opinion and organize political and material support for the Soviet fight against Nazi Germany, particularly from the West. Solomon Mikhoels, the popular actor and director of the Moscow State Jewish Theatre, was appointed the JAC chairman. Other members were Der Nister, Itzik Feffer, Peretz Markish and Samuel Halkin. They wrote texts and petitions as cries for help against the Nazi pogroms. Among others, the texts were printed in U.S. newspapers. The JAC also raised funds.

In 1947, Der Nister made a trip to Birobidzhan, the USSR Jewish Autonomous Region near the Chinese border. He traveled there on a special migrant train, together with a thousand Holocaust survivors, to evaluate the development of the self-governing Jewish settlement in this area. However, very soon Stalin changed policy to the extermination of Jewish writers and the destruction of Jewish culture in the Soviet Union. In February 1949, Der Nister was one of the last of the Jewish writers arrested. The Soviet authorities officially reported Der Nister died on 4 June 1950 in an unknown Soviet prison hospital. Many of Der Nister's contemporaries would be killed in August 1952 in the Night of the Murdered Poets, including Itzik Feffer, Peretz Markish, David Hofstein, Leib Kvitko and David Bergelson.

Der Nister's last writings, describing the persecution and destruction of the Jewish communities in Europe under the Nazi regime, and hinting at Soviet persecution as well, were collected in a work, Vidervuks, published posthumously in 1969.

Israel Joshua Singer, another famous Yiddish novelist, once said of Der Nister that "had writers of the whole world been given a chance to read [his] work, they would have broken their pens.”

Burial site
For more than a half-century after his death in captivity, Der Nister's place of death was not known to the public. In August 2017, researchers from Israel and Russia located his remains at a prisoner cemetery in the village of Abez, near Vorkuta, where he was recorded to have died on June 4, 1950. The researchers set up an improvised memorial atop his unmarked grave consisting of a Star of David fashioned from barbed wire.

Works
Even in his earliest works, he was drawn to the arcane teachings of the Kabbalah and to the intense use of symbols in his writings.

His best-known work, Di mishpokhe Mashber ("The Family Mashber"), is a naturalistic family saga. The work is a realistically written description of Jewish life in his native city Berdychiv at the end of the 19th century, with the three brothers as main actors: Moshe is a proud business man; Luzi is a skeptic mystic and benefactor who believes with brave defiance in the eternity of the Jewish people, probably a self-representation of Kahanovich; and Alter is a philanthropic altruist. David Roskies calls the depiction of the protagonist, Moshe, "the most finely wrought portrait of a hasidic merchant in all of Yiddish literature."  As in the novel, whose protagonist's brother joins the Breslover Hasidim, Pinchas's brother Aaron did the same.  Der Nister himself was influenced by Rebbe Nachman's Hasidic parables, though this manifests in his fiction, Roskies argues, through a filter of Russian modernism, and authors like Andrei Bely also influenced his work.

Di mishpokhe Mashber ("The Family Mashber") was translated into Hebrew in 1962, into French in 1984, into English by Leonard Wolf in 1987, into German in 1990, and into Dutch in 2002 by Willy Brill.

Der Nister appears as one of the main characters in the novel The World to Come (2006) by Dara Horn. The book describes Kahanovich's uneasy friendship with artist Marc Chagall, inside whose frames he hid some of his writings. Adaptations, descriptions, and excerpts from his stories, and those of other Yiddish writers, are included. (Horn makes one fictional change: Der Nister dies almost as soon as arrested, whereas in reality he died the following year, or maybe as late as 1952 according to some sources).

Selected works
 Gedankn un motivn — lider in proze ("Ideas and Motifs — Prose Poems"), Vilna, 1907 
 Hekher fun der erd ("Higher than the Earth"), Warsaw, 1910 
 Gezang un gebet ("Song and Prayer"), Kiev, 1912 (collection of songs)
 Translation of selected tales from Hans Christian Andersen,  1918
 Mayselekh in ferzn ("Stories in Verse"), 1918/19 (many editions: Kiev, Warsaw, Berlin)
 Gedakht ("Imagined"), Berlin, 1922/23 (collection of fantastic stories, 2 vols.)
 Fun mayne giter ("From My Estates"), Kiev, 1929 
 Hoyptshtet ("Capital Cities"), Moscow, 1934
 Zeks mayselekh ("Six Little Tales"),  1939 
 Di mishpokhe Mashber ("The Family Mashber"), Kiev, 1939 (Vol. 1), New York, 1948 (Vol. 2)
 Korbones ("Victims"), Moscow, 1943 
 Dertseylungen un eseyen ("Stories and Essays"), New York, 1957 (posthumous)
 Vidervuks ("Regeneration"), Moscow, 1969 (posthumous)

References

Bibliography
 Delphine Bechtel: Der Nister’s Work 1907–1929: A Study of a Yiddish Symbolist. Bern 1990 (= «Contacts» Etudes et Documents, III, 11).
 Delphine Bechtel: Der Nister’s ‘Der Kadmen’: a Metaphysical Narration on Cosmogony and Creation. , Yiddish, vol. VIII, n° 2, New York, 1992, p. 38–54.
 Saul Kaleko, Artikel NISTER, in: Jüdisches Lexikon, Bd. IV/1, Berlin 1927. (German)
 Ber Kotlerman: Broken Heart / Broken Wholeness: The Post-Holocaust Plea for Jewish Reconstruction of the Soviet Yiddish Writer Der Nister. Academic Studies Press, Boston 2017
 Peter B. Maggs: The Mandelstam and „Der Nister“ Files: An Introduction to Stalin-Era Prison and Labor Camp Records. 1995.
 Daniela Mantovan-Kromer: Female Archetypes in Nister's Symbolist Short Stories. Jerusalem 1992 (Beitrag zur  4. International Conference in Yiddish Studies).
 Daniela Mantovan-Kromer: Der Nister's 'In vayn-keler'. A Study in Metaphor. In: The Field of Yiddish. Fifth Collection, Northwestern University Press and YIVO Institute for Jewish Research, New York 1993.
 Salman Reisen, Leksikon fun der Yidisher Literatur un Prese, 1926 ff., Vol. II. (Yiddish) 
 Günter Stemberger, Geschichte der jüdischen Literatur, 1977. (German)
 Uncovering the Hidden: The Works and Life of Der Nister, ed. Estraikh Gennady, Hoge Kerstin, and Krutikov Mikhail. Studies in Yiddish 12, Legenda, Oxford 2014
 Salomon Wininger,  Vol. III, 1925 ff. (German)

External links
Der Nister and his symbolist short stories (1913-1929): Patterns of imagination by Daniela Mantovan, Columbia University (1993)
Der Nister in The YIVO Encyclopedia of Jews in Eastern Europe

 Daniela Mantovan-Kromer: Der Nister. The hidden one 
 Der Nister 1884-1950 short biography

1884 births
1950 deaths
People from Berdychiv
Ukrainian Jews
Jewish writers
Yiddish-language writers
Translators to Yiddish
Jewish philosophers
Soviet Jews
20th-century translators
Prisoners who died in Soviet detention